Chintamaneni Prabhakar (born January 3, 1968) is an Indian politician who served as a Member of the Legislative Assembly (MLA) in the state of Andhra Pradesh . A senior member of the Telugu Desam Party, he represented the Denduluru Assembly constituency from 2009 to 2019, and as a whip of  Andhra Pradesh Legislative Assembly from 2014 to 2019.

References 

Living people
People from West Godavari district
Andhra Pradesh MLAs 2009–2014
Andhra Pradesh MLAs 2014–2019
Telugu Desam Party politicians
1968 births